Nabarup Jatiya Vidyapith is a regional private school in Nagaon, Assam, India established in 2003.

Profile 
Nabarup Jatiya Vidyapith is a private school established with the goal of providing educational opportunities for the people of Nagaon, Assam. Its library, in the name of Debakanta Baruah, contains books and resources available to all students.

Academic facilities and publishing house
The institution is divided into the following academic units: 

 Sankardev Nritya Natya Chora
 Rudra Baruah-Tarikuddin Sangeet Chora
 Nabakanta Baruah Sahitya Chora
 Mahendra Nath Deka Phukan Chitrasala
 Einstein science club and laboratory
 Bhabendra Nath Saikia Omola Ghor
 Madhav kandali Auditorium

The school also has its own publishing house, NJV Publications, that publishes books of all types but mainly on children's literature.

Nagaon
2003 establishments in Assam
Educational institutions established in 2003
Private schools in Assam